In enzymology, a licodione 2'-O-methyltransferase is an enzyme that catalyzes the chemical reaction

S-adenosyl-L-methionine + licodione  S-adenosyl-L-homocysteine + 2'-O-methyllicodione

Thus, the two substrates of this enzyme are S-adenosyl methionine and licodione, whereas its two products are S-adenosylhomocysteine and 2'-O-methyllicodione.

This enzyme belongs to the family of transferases, specifically those transferring one-carbon group methyltransferases.  The systematic name of this enzyme class is S-adenosyl-L-methionine:licodione 2'-O-methyltransferase.

References

 

EC 2.1.1
Enzymes of unknown structure